Hollywood Theatre or Hollywood Theater may refer to:
Hollywood Theater (Minneapolis), Minnesota, listed on the U.S. National Register of Historic Places (NRHP)
Hollywood Theatre (Portland, Oregon), NRHP-listed
Hollywood Theater (Leavenworth, Kansas), listed on the NRHP in Leavenworth County
Hollywood Theatre (Las Vegas), at the MGM Grand Las Vegas
Hollywood Theatre (New York City) – the original name of the Mark Hellinger Theatre
Hollywood Theatre (Toronto) – Toronto's first cinema built to show "talkies"